János Szálas (born 19 May 1956) is a Hungarian racewalker. He competed in the men's 20 kilometres walk at the 1980 Summer Olympics.

References

1956 births
Living people
Athletes (track and field) at the 1980 Summer Olympics
Hungarian male racewalkers
Olympic athletes of Hungary
Place of birth missing (living people)